Credo ut intelligam (alternatively spelled Credo ut intellegam) is Latin for "I believe so that I may understand" and is a maxim of Anselm of Canterbury (Proslogion, 1), which is based on a saying of Augustine of Hippo (crede ut intellegas,  "believe so that you may understand") to relate faith and reason. In Anselm's writing, it is placed in juxtaposition to its converse, intellego ut credam ("I think so that I may believe"), when he says Neque enim quaero intelligere ut credam, sed credo ut intelligam ("I do not seek to understand in order that I may believe, but rather, I believe in order that I may understand"). It is often associated with Anselm's other famous phrase fides quaerens intellectum ("faith seeking understanding").
Augustine understood the saying to mean that a person must believe in something in order to know anything about God.

See also

Apophatic theology § The via eminentiae
Fides et ratio

References

Latin religious words and phrases
Philosophy of religion